Hylton Mitchell (12 September 1926 – 7 February 2014) was a Trinidadian cyclist. He competed in the three events at the 1956 Summer Olympics.

References

1926 births
2014 deaths
Trinidad and Tobago male cyclists
Olympic cyclists of Trinidad and Tobago
Cyclists at the 1956 Summer Olympics
20th-century Trinidad and Tobago people